Die Krokodile ('The Crocodiles') was a small poets' society in Munich which existed from 1856 to the 1870s.

Background and beginnings 
King Ludwig I had constructed the Glyptothek and the Pinakothek to house art collections. Part of his intention was to attract intellectual luminaries to Munich, with little result before the efforts made by his successor Maximilian II. Among others came the chemist Justus von Liebig, the ethnologist Wilhelm Heinrich Riehl and the historian Heinrich von Sybel.

Two poets who arrived in Munich were Emanuel Geibel and Paul Heyse. In 1852 they joined the cultural society Die Zwanglosen, founded in 1838, which was intended to serve as a meeting-place for both native Bavarians and the new arrivals, the so-called Nordlichter ("northern lights"). However the two groups became fractious and in 1858 Geibel left. Heyse had already created a new society, following the model of the Tunnel über der Spree in Berlin, of which both he and Geibel had been members.

Heyse and Julius Grosse held the inaugural meeting on 5 November 1856 in the coffee-house Zur Stadt München. In the first years Friedrich von Bodenstedt, Felix Dahn, Wilhelm Hertz and Hermann Lingg joined. It was claimed by Felix Dahn that the name of the society came about because of the coincidence that both Geibel and Lingg had recently written poems about crocodiles, but it seems more probable that Lingg's poem Das Krokodil von Singapur was the sole inspiration.

{|
|Das Krokodil von Singapur

Im heil'gen Teich zu Singapur
Da liegt ein altes Krokodil
Von äußerst grämlicher Natur
Und kaut an einem Lotusstil.

Es ist ganz alt und völlig blind,
Und wenn es einmal friert des Nachts,
So weint es wie ein kleines Kind,
Doch wenn ein schöner Tag ist, lacht's.
||The Crocodile of Singapore

The Holy Pond of Singapore
Contains an ancient Crocodile,
The glummest kind you ever saw:
It chews upon a lotus stem.

It's old and now completely blind,
And when the night is freezing cold,
It weeps just like a little child:
But in the day's warm light it laughs.
|}

"The sublime character of this amphibian seemed to us an admirable example to idealistic poets, and we hoped that in our 'holy pond' we should be able to armour ourselves against the base prosaic world, just as we always used to, minding nothing except maybe changes in temperature." (Paul Heyse: Jugenderinnerungen und Bekenntnisse)

At meetings, recent works both foreign and local were examined and discussed. As in the Tunnel über der Spree, members adopted pseudonyms: Geibel for example was the Urkrokodil. A complete list of members has not survived.

Literary influence 
The group is distinguishable from the Young Germany movement by its non-political stance. The Crocodiles preferred to see poetry as a pure and almost sacred art, ideally following ancient, medieval, and even Oriental models; the result was an eclectic body of work, often of the highest craftsmanship but lacking literary substance. Not coincidentally, most of what has survived has been translations and adaptations, such as Bodenstedt's reworking of Oriental sources and Hertz's poems based on medieval material.

After the death of Maximilian II in 1864, policies changed and the grooming of immigrant artists was discontinued. Die Krokodile had lost their main sponsor and public role. An attempt to produce a second group anthology in 1866 was a failure. The society remained in existence chiefly as a social club.

Members 
 Max Beilhack (Nashorn)
 Friedrich Bodenstedt (Apis)
 Otto Philipp Braun
 Julius Braun
 Moritz Carrière (Schiff der Wüste)
 Felix Dahn (Gnu) –– Gründungsmitglied
 Hermann Ethé
 Gustav Flörke
 Emanuel Geibel (Urkrokodil)
 Franz Grandaur
 Julius Grosse (Ichnoymon)
 Leonhard Hamm
 Max Haushofer
 Karl August Heigel
 Wilhelm Hemsen (Skarabäus)
 Wilhelm Hertz (Werwolf)
 Paul Heyse (Eidechs)
 Bernhard Hofmann
 Hans Hopfen
 Oskar Horn
  – honorary member
 Wilhelm Jensen
 Konrad Knoll – honorary member
 
 Ludwig Laistner
 Karl Lemcke (Hyäne)
 Heinrich Leuthold (Alligator)
 Sigmund Lichtenstein (Nilpferd)
 Hermann Lingg (Teichkrokodil)
 Karl von Lützow (Biber)
 Andreas May
 Melchior Meyr (Ibis)
 Karl Woldemar Neumann (Schwertfisch)
 Ludwig Nohl
 Theodor Pixis – honorary member
 
 Adolf Friedrich von Schack – honorary member
 Joseph Victor von Scheffel – honorary member
 Hermann Schmid
 Oskar Schmidt
 Ludwig Schneegans
 August Schricker
 Johann Schrott – honorary member
 Karl Stieler
 
 Franz Trautmann
 Robert Vischer
 Gottfried Wandner
 
 
 Adolf Wilbrandt – honorary member
 Adolf Zeising

Publications 
 Emanuel Geibel (ed.): Ein Münchner Dichterbuch, Stuttgart 1862
 Paul Heyse (ed.): Neues Münchner Dichterbuch, Stuttgart 1882

Bibliography 
 Véronique de la Giroday: Die Übersetzertätigkeit des Münchner Dichterkreises, Wiesbaden 1978
 Johannes Mahr (ed.): Die Krokodile. Ein Münchner Dichterkreis, Reclam, Stuttgart 1987
 Renate Werner: Gesellschaft der Krokodile. In: Wulf Wülfing et al. (ed.): Handbuch literarisch-kultureller Vereine, Gruppen und Bünde 1825–1933, Metzler, Stuttgart 1998, pp 155–161,

External links 
 Auszug aus Heyses Erinnerungen
Artikel (Gartenlaube, anon. 1866) über die "Krokodile in München" im Projekt "Lyriktheorie"
Prutz' Rezension des Ersten "Münchner Dichterbuchs", 1862; im Projekt "Lyriktheorie"

German writers' organisations
German literary movements
19th-century German literature
Poetry movements